Alfred Sydney Meehl (26 January 1914 – 23 August 1986) was a former Australian rules footballer who played with Melbourne in the Victorian Football League (VFL).

Meehl later served in the Australian Army during World War II.

Notes

External links 

1914 births
Australian rules footballers from Melbourne
Melbourne Football Club players
1986 deaths
People from Brunswick, Victoria
Australian Army personnel of World War II
Military personnel from Melbourne